General elections were held in Gibraltar in 2000. They were won by Peter Caruana's incumbent Gibraltar Social Democrats (GSD), which received over 50% of the popular vote and won eight of the fifteen seats.

Results

By candidate
The first fifteen candidates were elected to the House of Assembly.

References

General elections in Gibraltar
Gibraltar
General
Election and referendum articles with incomplete results